Domingo Antonio Peralta Florencio (born 28 July 1986) is a Dominican footballer who plays as a forward for Vega Real and the Dominican Republic national team.

International career

International goals
Scores and results list Dominican Republic's goal tally first.

Honours
  Cibao
CFU Club Championship (1): 2017

References

External links

 Domingo Peralta en Fútbol Dominicano. Net
 
 fifa.com
 fifa.com
 Domingo Peralta at Footballdatabase

1986 births
Living people
People from Valverde Province
Dominican Republic footballers
Association football midfielders
Dominican Republic international footballers
Dominican Republic expatriate footballers
Expatriate footballers in Haiti
Liga Dominicana de Fútbol players
Ligue Haïtienne players
Cibao FC players